Events from the year 1851 in Sweden

Incumbents
 Monarch – Oscar I

Events

 11 June - The radical author Carl Jonas Love Almqvist flee to USA. 
 - The hospital Ersta diakoni is founded in Stockholm with Maria Cederschiöld (deaconess) as the leader of the first deaconesses in Sweden.
 - Inauguration of the Södra Teatern in Stockholm.

Births
 16 April – Ernst Josephson, painter (died 1906) 
 10 August – Frigga Carlberg, suffragette  (died 1925) 
 13 October – Knut Beckeman, architect (died 1943)
 4 November – Märta Eketrä, courtier and royal favorite (died 1894)

Deaths
 22 March - Göran Wahlenberg, naturalist (born 1780)
 - Gustafva Björklund,  cookery book-author and restaurant owner (born 1794)
 - Johanna Hård, pirate (born 1789)
 - Gustafva Lindskog, athlete (born 1794)
 - Anna Maria Thalén, Swedish fashion trader (born 1781)

References

 
Years of the 19th century in Sweden
Sweden